Coelodonta (from the Greek κοιλία, koilía and οδούς, odoús, "hollow tooth", in reference to the deep grooves of their molars) is an extinct genus of rhinoceros that lived in Eurasia between 3.7 million years to 10,000 years ago, in the Pliocene and the Pleistocene epochs. It is best known from the type species, the woolly rhinoceros (Coelodonta antiquitatis), which ranged throughout northern Eurasia during the Pleistocene. The earliest known species, Coelodonta thibetana, lived in Tibet during the Pliocene, with the genus spreading to the rest of Eurasia during the Pleistocene.

Species 

Species recognised as members of Coelodonta, according to Deng et al. (2011), include:
 Coelodonta thibetana (Deng et al. 2011): The most primitive species of the genus, inhabited the Tibetan Plateau during the Pliocene.
 Coelodonta nihowanensis (Chow, 1978): A primitive species from northern China, it lived in the earliest Pleistocene.
 Coelodonta tologoijensis (Beliajeva, 1966): Appeared in northern China around 2 million years ago, and was present in eastern Eurasia during the Early-Middle Pleistocene.
 Coelodonta antiquitatis (Blumenbach, 1799): The type species of the genus, commonly known as the woolly rhinoceros. It lived in the steppes of northern Eurasia during the Late Pleistocene, and was the last living representative of the genus.

Phylogeny 
The authors of the description of the species C. thibetana (Deng et al., 2011) proposed a cladogram to place phylogenetically their position in relation to other members of Rhinocerotidae, using the five extant species of rhinoceros and 13 extinct species. They found that Coelodonta was the sister taxon of the species Stephanorhinus hemitoechus. A 2019 study based on a 1.78 million year old Stephanorhinus. sp dental proteome from Georgia suggested the paraphyly of Stephanorhinus. Later DNA studies have found the woolly rhinoceros is closely related to Merck's rhinoceros (Stephanorhinus kirchbergensis), with an estimated divergence 5.5 million years ago. These two species in turn are most closely related to the Sumatran rhinoceros (Dicerorhinus sumatrensis) amongst living rhinoceros.

Cladogram after Liu et al, 2021:

 denotes extinct taxa

References

External links 

 Paleobiology Database

 
Pliocene first appearances
Pliocene rhinoceroses
Pleistocene genus extinctions
Pleistocene rhinoceroses
Pleistocene mammals of Europe
Pleistocene mammals of Asia
Taxa named by Heinrich Georg Bronn